Bojh is a 2015 Pakistani drama serial directed by Barkat Sidiki which aired on Geo TV on Monday and Tuesday nights at 10:00 p.m beginning 11 May 2015. The serial is written by Ghazala Aziz and produced by A&B Entertainment. It stars Maria Wasti, Syed Jibran, Qavi Khan, Samina Ahmad, Neelam Muneer, and Alyy Khan.

Plot
The serial is about a poor father (Qavi Khan) who has three daughters and one son. The son does not have any source of income and the whole house is just spending life on the pension of their aged father. It is quite difficult for the parents to marry their daughters into good families.

Cast 

Maria Wasti
Samina Ahmed
Syed Jibran 
Qavi Khan
Neelam Muneer
Alyy Khan
Nausheen Shah
Shahood Alvi
Kanwar Arsalan
Ayesha Khan as Ahsan's mother
Adnan Shah Tipu

External links 
   Bojh official site

Pakistani drama television series